Navolok is a rural locality (a village) in Plesetsky District, Arkhangelsk Oblast, Russia. The population was 4 as of 2012.

Geography 
It is located on the Puksa River.

References 

Rural localities in Plesetsky District